Speed the Memorial Best 1335days Dear Friends 1 was Japanese J-pop girlband, Speed's last best album (Part 1) before their official breakup in March 2000. This album was released on March 29, 2000.

Track listing
"Body & Soul"
"Steady" (Atlanta Mix)
"Happy Together"
"I Remember"
"Go! Go!  Heaven"
"Kiwi Love" (Dear Friends' House Remix)
"" Dreamin'
"Wake Me Up !" (Rise Mix)
"White Love"
"My Lonely Habit"
""
"My Graduation" (Album Version)
"" (Good Night Kiss Version)

Speed (Japanese band) albums
2000 greatest hits albums